Villa Sarmiento is a locality in Morón Partido in the province of Buenos Aires, Argentina. It is home to 17,737 people and has an area of 2.55 km².

History

With the foundation of the Fomento Villa Progreso society on 4 April 1909, the locality boomed and was taken into account by municipal authorities.

In 1913, Ward School was founded, becoming a symbol of Villa Sarmiento for its impressive architecture and beautiful school grounds.

See also 
 Morón Partido

References

Morón Partido
Populated places in Buenos Aires Province
Populated places established in 1909
1909 establishments in Argentina